"Danger Zone" is a song, with music composed by Giorgio Moroder and lyrics written by Tom Whitlock, which American singer-songwriter Kenny Loggins recorded and released in 1986. The song was one of the hit singles from the soundtrack to the 1986 American film Top Gun, the best-selling soundtrack of 1986, and one of the best-selling of all time. According to Allmusic.com, the album "remains a quintessential artifact of the mid-'80s" and the album's hits "still define the bombastic, melodramatic sound that dominated the pop charts of the era." The song is also featured in the 2022 sequel film Top Gun: Maverick and its soundtrack, using the same original recording.

Background

Film producers Jerry Bruckheimer and Don Simpson, along with music supervisor Michael Dilbeck, had over 300 songs to employ on Top Gun. Testing compositions against the dailies of the opening scenes at the aircraft carrier, nothing satisfied them, and Bruckheimer asked soundtrack producer Giorgio Moroder to write something. With the help of songwriter Tom Whitlock, he composed "Danger Zone" and had Joe Pizzulo record a demo. With the approval of the producers, soundtrack distributor Columbia Records requested Moroder to have "Danger Zone" performed by an artist signed by the label. Pizzulo's original demo version would later make a partial appearance in the 1987 TV movie Cracked Up.

The band Toto was originally intended to perform the track, but legal conflicts between the producers of Top Gun and the band's lawyers prevented this. According to Steve Lukather, when the band sent their version to the producers, they were told that only Joseph Williams' vocal would be used, which the band deemed unacceptable and pulled out. In a 2022 interview with AXS TV, Kenny Loggins revealed that it was Jefferson Starship that was the first act to be offered the track, but the band pulled out of the project.

Corey Hart was also approached to perform "Danger Zone," which he declined, preferring to write and perform his own compositions. Loggins said in a 2022 interview that Kevin Cronin told him he said no because the notes were too high.

Eventually, the film producers offered the song to Loggins, who would recall his assent to recording "Danger Zone" as "a very snap judgement". Whitlock went to Loggins' Encino home, and once shown the lyrics, the singer added his own improvisations. Reaching number 2 on the Billboard Hot 100, "Danger Zone" was kept out of the number 1 spot by Peter Gabriel's "Sledgehammer". It became Loggins' second-highest chart hit, bested only by his 1984 number 1 hit "Footloose". In a 2008 interview, Loggins said that the song does not represent himself as an artist.

In 2018, Loggins told TMZ that he was having discussions with the film's lead actor Tom Cruise about having a new version of the song featured in the then-upcoming film Top Gun: Maverick. Ultimately, however, the original recording was used instead; Loggins stated that Cruise wanted to invoke the same feelings listening to the song as with the original Top Gun.

Overview
Dann Huff, lead singer and guitarist of the 1980s hard rock group Giant, played guitar on the song. The bass line is performed on a Yamaha DX7 synthesizer. A tenor saxophone is added near the end of the song.

The song peaked at number two on the US Billboard Hot 100 for the week of July 26, 1986.

Music video
A music video was released in May 1986 to promote the single. The video was directed by Tony Scott and featured footage of Loggins singing, as well as clips from the film Top Gun, which Scott also directed.

In popular culture
The song is a constant reference in the animated show Archer, mostly by series protagonist Sterling Archer, as both his favorite song and a catchphrase. Loggins also appeared on an episode as a fictionalized version of himself.

The song appears in the fictional radio station Los Santos Rock Radio on the enhanced version of the 2013 video game Grand Theft Auto V.

A remix of the song appeared in the 2019 video game Ace Combat 7: Skies Unknown, through a collaborative DLC to promote Top Gun's sequel Top Gun: Maverick.

The song made an appearance in the Nickelodeon series The Really Loud House as part of a montage in the episode "Ro-Bro".

Personnel
Kenny Loggins – vocals and rhythm guitar
Dann Huff – lead guitar
Giorgio Moroder – synthesizers, sequencer and drum machine
Tom Whitlock – synthesizer
Tom Scott – saxophone

Charts

Weekly charts

Year-end charts

Certifications

Sampling
 In 1991, the American rock band Guns N' Roses released the song "You Could Be Mine", which uses the same verse melody as "Danger Zone".

References

1986 singles
1986 songs
American rock songs
American hard rock songs
American new wave songs
Columbia Records singles
Kenny Loggins songs
Songs about the military
Songs from Top Gun
Songs written by Giorgio Moroder
Songs written by Tom Whitlock